April Hickox (born 1955) is a Canadian lens-based artist, photographer, teacher and curator whose practice includes various medias, from photography, film, video and installation.

Hickox has said about her works of the last 10 years, "I think in my work, I have always worked with history, place and a sense of self, and sometimes language, communication and voice". Hickox has created works surrounding numerous themes including landscape, history, memory, site… Hickox's works are largely based on narratives which record aspects of humanity and nature and explore the relationship between the two with collective memories from human histories and activities.

Hickox is the founding director of Gallery 44 Centre For Contemporary Photography, as well as a founding member of Tenth Muse Studio and Artscape.

Early life, education and career 

In 1955, April Hickox was born in Oakville, Ontario. She and her family moved to Toronto Islands when she was 3 years old.

In order to continue to explore interests in photography, Hickox went to London to study photography and graphic design in Twickenham College of Technology from 1973 to 1974. Hickox returned to Canada for the 5th year graduate studies program at the Ontario College of Art and Design in Toronto, where she obtained an AOCA degree and further explored her interests in photography and printmaking from 1974 to 1978.

Hickox lives on the Toronto Islands from which she derives much of her inspiration. Her personal experiences as a mother of a deaf daughter also contribute as inspirations for her works, such as her installation work Within Dialogue which shows the visual representation of language and communication across individuals and cultures.

She is an associate professor at the Ontario College of Art and Design University.

Works 
Hickox' has created works surrounding numerous themes including landscape, history, memory, site, language, communication and voice ... Hickox's works are largely based on narratives which record aspects of humanity and nature and contribute to the deeper understandings of its relationship with collective memories from human histories and activities.

Landscape 
Since Hickox move to the Toronto Islands at an early age, she has experienced the frequent change of the island's environment caused by human intervention. The relationship between natural landscape and human intervention has been considered by Hickox and become a central theme of her work for over thirty-five years.

Memory 
A lot of Hickox's work contains images of collected objects, from either people on the Toronto islands or her own collection such as the series named Gather.

Crystal, Porcelain, Glass, 2002 
Crystal, Porcelain, Glass is a series of photos of broken tea cups or the fragments of various broken objects. They were either held by a variety of hands in various positions or being repaired and stacked in what appears to be a fragile tower. All of the broken objects belong to an older woman who had died on the Toronto Islands. They were collected by Hickox from a bridge that is often called the free bridge. In an interview, Hickox described her work as "a recycle of life and change". From this project, Hickox started to think about people who were gone, the houses that were clearly lost and what was left behind. This work eventually led into the series Landscape + Memory: An Island History in 2003.

Memento, 2007 
Memento is a series of images of family heirlooms, which incorporate a photographic element. All the heirlooms were collected from Hickox's female friends and have been passed down through generations. There is always an intimate story behind each heirloom, the objects act as reminders of loved ones who have passed away. However, all the photographic portraits from the heirlooms are rarely identified and the significance of the photos has been shifted. Memento not only records all the stories but also helps to reflect the fragility of the connection and physicality.

Landscape + Memory

Landscape + Memory: An Island History, 2003 
Since Toronto Islands contains one of Toronto's oldest residential communities, the work Landscape + Memory: An Island History explores the links between the physical landscape, as it is today, and the memories of that landscape. All the sites in Hickox's photographs were once part of a thriving community whose homes were demolished in the 1950s. The photographs record how the land has changed after the demolition of the homes, capturing the remaining flora and landscape that now covers the resident's old home in each photo. Hickox demonstrates this work as the "traces and evidence of the past".

Point Pelee: Landscape and Memory, 2004 
Point Pelee: Landscape and Memory was commissioned by The Art Gallery of Windsor in 2003. Point Pelee has a similar history to the Toronto Island in that it was once a vibrant community before the land was purchased in the 1970s to develop a national park. Over the years, Hickox has observed the changes that have taken place in the park and documented the overlapping layers of human and natural histories through photographing. The exhibition aims to "evoke a dialogue on the history of our region, environmental issues, and the way in which communities evolve over time". According to Hickox, the big difference between the project Point Pelee: Landscape and Memory and Landscape + Memory: An Island History is that there are less traces and evidence of the past found in the project Point Pelee. Since people tried to plant new indigenous species in the park, the residents plants had been removed.

Language, communication and voice 
As an artist as well as a mother to a deaf daughter, April Hickox started to explore the photographic works on the themes of language, communication and voice which had become her main focus in the past ten years.

Can You Hear Flowers? 1994 
Can You Hear Flowers? was produced based on Hickox's personal experience as a mother to a deaf daughter. These experiences were transformed into a site specific work outside the Power Plant in Toronto. According to April Hickox, "the garden consisted of four sensory gardens. The idea for this work came from the question of a deaf child. Adult responses impact on a child's perception of the world around her."

Within Dialogue, 2000 
Within Dialogue is an installation work which consists of 100 photographs of mouths in the motion of communication. In 2000, The Globe and Mail reviewed an April Hickox's exhibition Within Dialogue in Toronto's Leo Kamen Gallery in the news article Hickox's Photographs "Speak Eloquently from Silence". It was mentioned that the 150, small, black and white photographs of mouths embodies Hickox's fascination with the mouth and paradoxical silence. The diverse pictures of the human mouth reflect a wide range of potential identities from the deaf to the hearing. There is also a sense of associated emotional and personal experiences as the mother to a deaf daughter. April Hickox also collaborated with Tom Third on the audio component of Within Dialogue to provide viewers an infused experience of sound and silence.

Feminism 
Hickox often uses photography as media to record images of women or female objects from the past, she mainly focuses on how they reflect female identity and self-recognition throughout time.

Lives of Girls and Women, 1972–1973
This series of works, completed between 1972 and 1973, contains fourteen images of Barbie doll clothing to reflect how gender stereotypes are imposed by social structures and pressures, ultimately expressed through popular media of the society. There are fictional conversations constructed under the typical representational clothes from women's magazine. Barbie doll clothes largely reflected the changing trends in women's clothing and lifestyle since their creation. Hickox borrows the Barbie doll clothes and combines them with a new narrative to present the changes in not only the representations of women over time but also the changing thoughts and life experiences of women throughout recent history.

Women, 1999 – 2001 
This series of work consists of 9 portraits of women over 50 in age. In these black and white photographs, the women display a reflective look while closing their eyes. In this series Hickox is trying to explore the inner strength of these women and question the relationship between these women and the viewers of the images, questioning photography as the means for communication. The representations of women were derived based on the concept of women being the carrier of family memories over generations. However, in contemporary meda, mature women usually appear invisible compared their young and beautiful counterparts, while their experiences and values are also underestimated by society. From viewing the thought provoking portraits, one could reduce the misunderstanding of the mature woman from who they truly are.

Echo, 2010These works are representing different types of hand-mirrors as a traditional female object. People would use the mirrors to see their reflection make the adjustments to their makeup/hair that they felt they needed. These actions made Hickox consider about the self-being presented in the public, and that that self may be different from the ones we truly are and what we truly believe. Nevertheless, the mirrors being photographed are unable to reflect as the mirror images are transformed into a sea of black by the scanning process. The reflection is no longer available.

Dialogue, 2012 
These works picture a young girl in different moments of her life. According to Hickox, these photos of a young female represents snapshots of her daughter's life in the information age. She demonstrates her work as "I see these images not so much as a portrait of my daughter, but as a portrait of a moment in time that could exist in the lives of many women in our Digital Age". Therefore, these works bridge the dialogue between this general representation of moments of a young female and many other women's life moments.

10x10, 2014 
This work consists of five portraits of couples gazing toward the viewers in various settings. These photographs were a commissioned work for the Toronto base 10x10 Photography Project to celebrate the LGBT Canadians in the arts.

Portraits

Toronto Island Workers, 2009 – 2013 
This series of work consists of over 90 public installation pieces of life-size photographs of city staff (farmers, gardeners, lifeguards, maintenance workers, etc.) on the Toronto Islands between 2009 and 2013. In the CBC interview of April Hickox, it was mentioned that the City staff are an important part of the local community who produced the opportunity to relax with their hard works. According to April Hickox, these workers should be recognized for their investments in jobs physically, emotionally and spiritually toward building the safe and beautiful environments. In fact, the installations of the works actually made the workers happy by recognizing them instead for their contribution to the city, instead of being invisible to the general public. April Hickox was appreciated by the islanders for drawing attention to these workers and reminding them not to take the environment for granted. April and colleagues presented the photographs to the visitors, making the social engagement and interactions between the installed photographs and viewers possible.

Exhibitions 
 2014 Invasive Species, Katsman Contemporary, Toronto, Ontario
 2012 Vantage, Main Space, Katsman Kamen Gallery,Toronto, Ontario
 2010 Compost, Leo Kamen Gallery, Project Room, Toronto, Ontario
 2009 Gather, an installation of five backlit billboards. Harbourfront Centre, Toronto, Ontario
 2008 Ritual, Leo Kamen Gallery, Toronto, Ontario
 2006 Drift, Leo Kamen Gallery, Toronto, Ontario
 2003 Landscape and Memory, Main Space, Leo Kamen Gallery, Toronto, Ontario Landscape and Memory: Point Pelee, an installation at the Art Gallery Of Windsor, Windsor, Ontario
 2002 Porcelain, Crystal, Glass, Main Space, Leo Kamen Gallery, Toronto, Ontario
 2001 Glance, Leo Kamen Gallery, Project Room, Toronto, Ontario
 2000 Within Dialogue, an installation at Leo Kamen Gallery, Toronto, Ontario; Within Dialogue, site specific installation, St. Norbert Cultural Centre, Winnipeg, Manitoba
 1999 Untitled, site specific installation, Portland and Richmond Streets, Toronto, Ontario
 1998 Tracings, Prime Gallery, Toronto, Ontario Song, installation, Portland and Richmond Streets, Toronto, Ontario
 1997 Blink, street level photographic installation, Portland and Adelaide Streets, Toronto, Ontario Utopia/Dystopia, billboard project, Floating Gallery, Winnipeg, Manitoba
 1996 Excerpts Photography Narrative, centre d'exposition l'imagier, Aylmer, Quebec
 1995 Dissonance and Voice, installation and outdoor site work, curated by Richard Rhodes, Oakville Galleries, Oakville, Ontario When the Mind Hears, Tom Thomson Art Gallery, Owen Sound, Ontario New Works, Thunder Bay Art Gallery, Thunder Bay, Ontario
 1994 When the Mind Hears, Vu, centre d'animation et de diffusion de la photographie, Québec When the Mind Hears, part one, Gallery 44 Centre for Contemporary Photography, Toronto When the Mind Hears, part two, Garnet Press, Toronto When the Mind Hears, The Photographers Gallery, Saskatoon, Saskatchewan
 1993 When the Mind Hears, le mois de la photo, Complexe de la Cité, Montréal
 1992 Roses, Wind and Other Stories, Floating Gallery, Winnipeg, Manitoba Roses, W ind and Other Stories, Garnet Press, Toronto Roses, Wind and Other Stories, Galerie Séquence, Chicoutimi Roses, Wind and Other Stories, Vu, centre d'animation et de diffusion de la photographie, Québec
 1991 Speak, Presentation House Gallery, Vancouver, B.C. 1990 So to Speak, La Centrale (Galerie Powerhouse), Montréal, Quebec

Teaching 
As a past chair of the photography department at the Ontario College of Art and Design (OCAD) in Toronto from 1998 to 2007,

She is currently employed as an associate professor of photography at OCAD. Hickox has previously held academic appointments at the following institutions: Ryerson University (1997), Canadore College (1989), Art Gallery of Ontario (1985–89), and University of Toronto (1985–90).

Community involvement 
Hickox has served as a member of several charitable and academic organizations in Toronto from 1997 to 2013. To mark the beginning of this involvement in 1997, Hickox served as a founding member of  Gallery 44 Center for Contemporary Photography, a non-profit studio in Toronto where she held the position of director for seven years. Gallery 44 is an artist-run initiative whose mission statement is providing affordable resources to support photography-based artists.

Hickox is also a founding member of the Toronto-based Tenth Muse Studio, and Artscape, which she acquired the position as a committee member for the Founding board of directors in 1998. Through Artscape, Hickox directs artists' residencies and studio rentals on Toronto Islands under the Gibraltar Point Centre for the Arts.

From 1997 to 2000, Hickox was the Advisor and Training Coordinator for Arts and Crafts at Silent Voice Camp for the Deaf, in honour of her deaf daughter Alex. She simultaneously became a part of the Manitoba Mentoring Artists for Women's Art in Manitoba, CA.  From 2010 to 2011, Hickox was responsible for building an online art collection as part of her role as guest curator for the Line Art Auction held by the LGBT Youth Line at the Art Gallery of Ontario Between 2010 and 2013, Hickox held the position of committee member for Project 31, a fundraising auction that supports OCAD University. In 2013, Hickox also fulfilled the committee membership role as the Co-Curatorial Chair for the Art with Heart event at the Casey House Fundraising auction of Canadian Contemporary Art to support HIV/AIDS.

In 2021, she was one of the participants in John Greyson's experimental short documentary film International Dawn Chorus Day.

Collections 
Works by April Hickox are held in, among others, 
the Art Gallery of Peterborough
the Art Gallery of Hamilton, 
the Kitchener Waterloo Art Gallery, 
the Canada Council Art Bank, 
the Canadian Museum of Contemporary Photography,  
the Winnipeg Art Gallery, 
the Agnes Etherington Art Centre, and 
the Burnaby Art Gallery.

References

External links 
 Official site

1955 births
Living people
Canadian installation artists
Canadian photographers
Canadian art curators
Canadian women artists
Canadian video artists
Women video artists
Canadian women curators
Academic staff of Canadore College